Heard Ya Missed Me, Well I'm Back is the eighth studio album by American funk/soul/rock band Sly and the Family Stone, released by Epic/CBS Records in 1976. This album is an effort to return the idea of the "Family Stone" band to singer/songwriter/multi-instrumentalist Sly Stone's work, after his previous album, High on You, was released without the Family Stone name. It also reflects the beginnings of change in the concept of "Sly and the Family Stone". The original Family Stone had broken up in 1975, and a new Family Stone was assembled for this album: the only holdover is stalwart Family Stone trumpetist Cynthia Robinson. Vet Stone and Elva Mouton, both formerly members of Family Stone backing band Little Sister, are credited as providing "additional background vocals".

Background 
Formerly a tangible self-contained band, the Family Stone broke up in January 1975 after a disastrous booking at the Radio City Music Hall. Subsequent to his 1975 solo album, Stone returned to using the name of his former band, although they were largely solo recordings. 

From this point on, each "Sly & the Family Stone" album would essentially be a Sly Stone solo recording, with contributions from a varying group of collaborators. Sometimes, members of the original Family Stone would participate in the sessions, and sometimes session players and new members would work with Stone as well. For the most part, however, Stone performed a large part of the instrumentation for each song on his own using multitracking (as he had been doing for Family Stone LPs since There's a Riot Goin' On in 1971). This album, like the others, includes a combination of all three types of recordings.

Only one single was released from this LP, "Family Again" b/w "Nothing Less than Happiness", which failed to chart. Epic released Sly from his recording contract in 1977, and released a remix album Ten Years Too Soon, in 1979. Ten Years Too Soon took several Sly & the Family Stone hits (among them "Dance to the Music", "Stand!", and "Everyday People") and had them reimagined as disco songs.

Track listing
All songs credit Sly Stone as songwriter and producer.

Side A
 "Heard Ya Missed Me, Well I'm Back" - 3:55
 "What Was I Thinkin' in My Head" - 3:58
 "Nothing Less Than Happiness" - 2:57
 "Sexy Situation" - 2:55
 "Blessing in Disguise" - 3:48

Side B
 "Everything in You" - 3:14
 "Mother Is a Hippie" - 3:01
 "Let's Be Together" - 3:36
 "The Thing" - 3:20
 "Family Again" - 2:46

Personnel

Sly & the Family Stone
Sly Stone - vocals, keyboards, guitar, bass, various instruments
Cynthia Robinson - trumpet, vocals
Joe Baker - guitar, vocals
Dwight Hogan - bass, vocals
John Colla - alto and soprano saxophone, vocals
Steve Schuster - tenor saxophone, flute
John Farey - keyboards, percussion
Virginia Ayers - vocals, percussion
Anthony Warren - drums
Lady Bianca - lead and background vocals, clavinet
Vicki Blackwell - violin

Assisting musicians
Ed Bogas and Sly Stone - string arrangements
Armando Peraza - timbales, congas
Peter Frampton - guitar on "Let's Be Together"
Sister Vet and Cousin Tiny - vocals
Karat Faye - engineer

Tour

References

1976 albums
Sly and the Family Stone albums
Albums produced by Sly Stone
Epic Records albums